Burston is a small hamlet near Rowsham in Buckinghamshire about  north of Aylesbury. It is in the civil parish of Aston Abbotts.

Originally an Iron Age settlement, it was overlooked by a defensive position on high ground (Burston Hill). Modern Burston consists of a few farms, including Burston Hill Farm, Lower Burston, and Burston Ridge Farm, but in the valley below earthworks of the old settlement remain.

Burston Hill, a high point to the north of the Vale of Aylesbury offers views across the vale and the Chiltern Hills.

Hamlets in Buckinghamshire